Ali Hassan Osman is a Somali politician. He belongs to the hawaadle clan. He is the former Minister of Agriculture of Somalia, having been appointed to the position on 27 January 2015 by the now former Prime Minister Omar Abdirashid Ali Sharmarke.

References

Living people
Government ministers of Somalia
Year of birth missing (living people)